Dermot Walsh (10 September 1924 – 26 June 2002) was an Irish stage, film and television actor, known for portraying King Richard the Lionheart in the 1962 television series Richard the Lionheart.

Early life
Born in Dublin, Walsh was the son of a journalist and a civil servant. He attended St Mary's College, Rathmines, and on the wishes of his parents, read Law at University College Dublin. Walsh studied acting at the Abbey Theatre School and spent three years with Lord Longford's repertory company at the Gate Theatre, working as an assistant stage hand.

Career
In 1945 Walsh moved to Britain and briefly joined the Croydon Repertory. Upon his return to Dublin he was spotted by a talent scout from the Rank Organisation. This led to parts in Bedelia, Hungry Hill and The Mark of Cain, and the beginning of Walsh's career in film. He appeared in seven films as a leading man, before returning to the theatre. Walsh later resumed his film career in a series of B movies. He appeared in over forty films made for film and a hundred for television, making his final film appearance in 1983.

Walsh made his first London stage appearance in George Bernard Shaw's Buoyant Billions at the Prince's Theatre in 1949. A prolific theatre actor, Walsh's many theatre credits included Reluctant Heroes, The Man Most Likely To, Laburnum Grove and The Mousetrap. He also turned his hand to writing and producing, writing the play The Murder Line in 1967 and producing later productions, including Blithe Spirit and Stage Struck.

Walsh's television work included appearances in Danger Man, No Hiding Place and  Softly, Softly. He also played the title role in all 39 half-hour episodes of the series Richard the Lionheart in 1962 and 1963.

Personal life
Walsh was married three times.  He married the actress Hazel Court in 1949, and the couple had a daughter, Sally (born 1950), before they were divorced in 1963. He next married another actress, Diana Scougall, in 1968, and the couple had a son, Michael (born 1969), before they were divorced in 1974. He married a third actress, Elizabeth Annear, that same year, and the couple had two daughters, Elisabeth Dermot Walsh (born 1974), herself now an actress, and Olivia (born 1977). Elizabeth Annear died in 1993.

Filmography

 1946 : Bedelia : Jim (Doctor's Chauffeur)
 1947 : The Mark of Cain : Jerome Thorn
 1947 : Hungry Hill : Wild Johnnie
 1947 : Jassy : Barney Hatton
 1948 : My Sister and I : Graham Forbes
 1948 : Third Time Lucky : Lucky
 1948 : To the Public Danger : Captain Cole
 1950 : Torment : Cliff Brandon
 1952 : The Floating Dutchman : Alexander James
 1952 : The Straw Man : Mal Farris
 1952 : The Frightened Man : Julius Roselli
 1952 : Ghost Ship : Guy Thornton
 1953 : The Blue Parrot : Bob Herrick
 1953 : Counterspy : Manning
 1954 : Night of the Silvery Moon : Robby
 1956 : The Hideout : Steve Curry
 1956 : Bond of Fear : John Sewell
 1957 : At the Stroke of Nine : MacDonnell
 1957 : The Gentle Killers (TV) : Paul Donaldson
 1958 : A Woman of Mystery : Ray Savage
 1958 : Sea Fury : Kelso
 1958 : Chain of Events : Quinn
 1958 : Sea of Sand : Commanding Officer
 1959 : Crash Drive : Paul Dixon
 1959 : Make Mine a Million : Martin Russell
 1959 : The Witness : Richard Brinton
 1959 : The Flesh and the Fiends : Dr Geoffrey Mitchell
 1959 : The Bandit of Zhobe : Captain Saunders
 1959 : The Crowning Touch : Aubrey Drake
 1960 : The Challenge : Detective Sergeant Willis
 1960 : Shoot to Kill : Mike Roberts
 1960 : The Trunk : Henry Maitland
 1960 : The Tell-Tale Heart : Carl Loomis
 1961 : Tarnished Heroes : Major Roy Bell
 1961 : The Breaking Point : Robert Wade
 1961 : Out of the Shadow : Professor Taylor
 1962 : The Switch : Inspector Tomlinson
 1962 : Emergency : John Bell
 1962 : The Cool Mikado : Elmer
 1962 : Richard the Lionheart : Richard the Lionheart
 1963 : Echo of Diana
 1966 : Infamous Conduct : Dr Anthony Searle
 1969 : Journey to the Unknown : Ken Talbot (episode "Matakitas Is Coming")
 1983 : The Wicked Lady : Lord Marwood
 1993 : The Princess and the Cobbler : Brigand (voice)

References

External links

Male actors from Dublin (city)
1924 births
2002 deaths
Irish male stage actors
Irish male film actors
Irish male television actors
Alumni of University College Dublin
20th-century Irish male actors